The 2011 Tour of Chongming Island Stage race was the fifth women's edition of the Tour of Chongming Island cycling stage race. It was rated by the UCI as category 2.1, and was held between 11 and 13 May 2011, in China.

Stages

Stage 1
11 May 2011 – Chongbei to Chongbei,

Stage 2
4 June 2011 – Chongxi to Chongxi,

Stage 3
5 June 2011 – Shanghai to Shanghai,

Final classifications

General classification

Source

Points Classification

Source

Team Classification

Source

See also
 2011 in women's road cycling

References

External links
Tour of Chongming Island website

Tour of Chongming Island
Tour of Chongming Island
2011 in Chinese sport